Chris Mould (born 1969) is a British illustrator and occasional writer of children's books. He exhibits his artwork regularly, and commits to an ongoing programme of events. He currently has over 20 books in print between the US and the UK. His notable works include A Boy Called Christmas, A Girl Who Saved Christmas, Father Christmas and Me, The Truth Pixie, The Iron Man, and Animal Farm.

Personal life
Mould was born in 1969 in Bradford, West Yorkshire.

When he left school at the age of 16, the only skill he had was drawing. He decided to go to an art school to study graphic design and then received a honours degree in Graphic Design & Illustration at Leeds Polytechnic.

Career
After graduation, Mould worked as a freelance illustrator from a studio in Oakenshaw for three years. He has collaborated with many publishers such as Oxford University Press, Bloomsbury, Canongate, HarperCollins, Macmillan, Penguin Random House,...

In December 2019, he became the patron of the Rotherham literacy centre. He joins other famous names Paul Clayton, Abi Elphinstone, Joanne Harris, Ian McMillan, Sir Paul Collier, Jeremy Dyson and Mark Gatiss in championing Grimm & Co as supporters and patrons.

In an interview in 2021, he named Ralph Steadman, Ronald Searle, George Cruikshank, Adam Stower, Alex T Smith, Peter Goes... as his artistic influences.  

As of 2021, he lives in Yorkshire with his wife and two grown-up daughters.

He currently works in a studio at Dean Clough, Halifax, West Yorkshire.

Works

As author and illustrator

 Dust 'n' Bones: Ten Ghost Stories (2006)
 76 Pumpkin Lane: Spooky House: Pop-Up Book (2007)
 76 Pumpkin Lane: Tombstone Rally (2008)
 Something Wickedly Weird Series:
 The Werewolf and the Ibis (2010)
 The Ice Pirates (2010)
 The Buccaneer's Bones (2010)
 The Curse of the Wolf (2010)
 The Smugglers' Secret (2010)
 The Golden Labyrinth (2010)
 Fangs 'n' Fire: Ten Dragon Tales (2010)
 Pop-up Ghost Train (2010)
 Spindlewood Series:
 Pip and the Wood Witch Curse (2011)
 Pip and the Twilight Seekers (2011)
 Pip and the Lost Children (2011)
 Pirates 'n' Pistols (2012)
 Pocket Pirates Series:
 The Great Cheese Robbery (2015)
 The Great Drain Escape (2018)
 The Great Flytrap Disaster (2019)
 The Great Treasure Hunt (2019)

As illustrator
written by other authors

 Hank the Clank (1995), by Michael Coleman
 Hank Clanks Again (1995), by Michael Coleman
 History's Great Inventors (1996), by Philip Ardagh
 History's Big Mistakes (1996), by Adam Bowett
 Treasure Island (1998), by Robert Louis Stevenson
 A-Haunting We Will Go & other spooky rhymes (1999), by Nicholas Tulloch
 Make 'Em Laugh (1999), by Clare Belan
 Doctor Jekyll and Mr.Hyde (2000), by Robert Louis Stevenson
 Unidentified Frying Omelette (2000), by Andrew Fusek Peters
 Twelfth Night (The Shakespeare Collection) (2000), by Jan Dean
 The Day Our Teacher Went Batty (2002), by Gervase Phinn
 Meet the Weirds (2003), by Kaye Umansky
 Gilbert (2003), by Colin Thompson
 Pirates (2003), by Chris Powling
 Fillet and the Mob  (2004), by Susan Ashe
 The Sandwich That Jack Made (2004), by Elspeth Graham
 Hercules: Superhero (2005), by Diane Redmond
 One Man Went to Mow (2007), by Rose Impey
 Young Wizards (2008), by Michael Lawrence
 The Shadow of Evil (2009), by Tim Pigott-Smith
 The Night I was Chased by a Vampire (2012), by Kaye Umansky
 Alistair Grim's Odditorium (2015), by Gregory Funaro
 The Beast (2016), by Michaela Morgan
 The Great Cheese Robbery (2016), by Tim Warnes
 Aunt Nasty (2016), by Margaret Mahy
 Duperball (2016), by Kes Gray
 The Sand Witch (2016), by Alan MacDonald
 Ronald the Tough Sheep (2016), by Martin Waddell
 The Prince and the Pee (2017), by Greg Gormley
 Young Dracula (2018), by Michael Lawrence
 Embassy of the Dead (2018), by Will Mabbitt
 Amazing Transport (2019), by Tom Jackson
 The Cosmic Atlas of Alfie Fleet (2019), by Martin Howard
 The Iron Man (2019), by Ted Hughes
 Wolfman (2019), by Michael Rosen
 The Greatest Spy Who Never Was (2019), by David Codd
 Alfie Fleet's Guide to the Universe (2020), by Martin Howard
 The Vanishing Trick (2020), by Jenni Spangler
 Animal Farm (2021), by George Orwell
 The Incredible Talking Machine (2021), by Jenni Spangler
 Isabelle and the Crooks (2022), by Michelle Robinson
 Billy Brute Whose Teacher Was a Werewolf (2022), by Issy Emeney
 Planet Football (2022), by Michelle Robinson

written by Barry Hutchison
 Benjamin Blank Series:
 The Shark-Headed Bear Thing (2015)
 The Swivel-Eyed Ogre-Thing (2015)
 The Moon-Faced Ghoul-Thing (2015)

written by Ian Ogilvy
 Measle Series:
 Measle and the Wrathmonk (2005) 
 Measle and the Mallockee (2005)
 Measle and the Dragodon (2006)
 Measle and the Slitherghoul (2007)
 Measle and the Doompit (2008)
 Measle Stubbs Adventure:
 The Funfair of Fear! (2010)
 The Pits of Peril! (2011)

written by Matt Haig
 A Boy Called Christmas (2015)
 The Girl Who Saved Christmas (2016)
 Father Christmas and Me (2017)
 The Truth Pixie (2018)
 The Truth Pixie Goes To School (2019)
 A Mouse Called Miika (2021)

written by Steve Webb
 Spangles McNasty Series:
 Spangles McNasty and the Fish of Gold (2016)
 Spangles McNasty and the Tunnel of Doom (2017)
 Spangles McNasty and the Diamond Skull (2018)

written by Tim Healey
 Mortimer Keene Series:
 Attack of the Slime (2013)
 Alien Abduction (2014)
 Dino Danger (2015)
 Robot Riot (2015)
 Ghosts on the Loose (2014)

Awards and recognitions
Awards
 2003 Nottingham Children's Book Award for Vesuvius Poovius by Kes Gray.
 2012 Swiss Prix Enfantasie Best Children's Novel Award.

Shortlisted
 2013 Kate Greenaway Medal for Pirates 'n' Pistols.
 2016 British Book Industry Awards for A Boy Called Christmas by Matt Haig.
 2016 Sheffield Children's Book Award for A Boy Called Christmas by Matt Haig.
 2017 Sheffield Children's Book Award for Pocket Pirates - The Great Drain Escape.
 2020 Kate Greenaway Medal for The Iron Man by Ted Hughes.

References

External links
 Chris Mould's official Instagram
 Chris Mould's official Twitter
 
 

1969 births
British illustrators
British children's book illustrators
Writers who illustrated their own writing
Living people